Shesh Ashray is a Bengali 2001 film directed by Ajit Ganguly and produced by Tushar Kanti Jana. The music of the film was composed by Anupam Dutta.

Plot

Cast
 Indrani Haldar
 Lily Chakraborty
 Arjun Chakraborty
 Satya Bandyopadhyay
 Shubhendu Chattopadhyay
 Shakuntala Barua

Soundtrack
All songs were composed by Anupam Dutta and lyrics by Pulak Banerjee.

"Bhulchho Keno Ei Je Ami" - Kumar Sanu, Anupama Deshpande 
"Ami Achhi Sukhe Achhi" (duet) - Kumar Sanu, Anupama Deshpande 
"Ami Achhi Sukhe Achhi" (female) - Anupama Deshpande 
"Biyer Aage Prem Bhalo Na" - Kumar Sanu 
"Ektu Pore Brishti Jani" - Anuradha Paudwal 
"Dukkho Kiser Kanna Kiser" - Sadhana Sargam 
"

References

External links
 Shesh Ashray at the Gomolo

Bengali-language Indian films
2001 films
2000s Bengali-language films
Films scored by Anupam Dutta